Chateaurenault (D 606) was a French  light cruiser, acquired as war reparations from Italy in 1947 which served in the French Navy from 1948 to 1961. She was named in honour of François Louis de Rousselet, Marquis de Châteaurenault. In Italian service, the ship was named Attilio Regolo after Marcus Atilius Regulus the Roman statesman and general who was a consul of the Roman Republic in 267 BC and 256 BC.

History

Italian service
Attilio Regolo was commissioned in August 1942 in Livorno. She was torpedoed by the submarine  on 7 November 1942, and remained in drydock for several months with her bow shattered. She was interned in Port Mahon in the island of Menorca, Spain, after the armistice on 9 September 1943.

French service
After the Peace Treaty on 10 February 1947, she and her sister ship Scipione Africano were transferred to France as war reparations (Scipione Africano was renamed Guichen). The ships were extensively rebuilt for the French Navy by La Seyne dockyard with new anti-aircraft-focused armament and fire-control systems in 1951–1954 with the following characteristics:

Displacement
Length
Beam
Draught
Machinery - unchanged
Armament
 6 – 105 mm guns (three twin turrets of German origin)
 10 – 57 mm guns (5 twin turrets)
 12 – 550 mm torpedo tubes
Sensors: Radar DRBV 20 A, DRBV 11, DRBC 11, DRBC 30, Sonar
Crew: 353

The ships were decommissioned in 1961.

Citations

References

External links

 Attilio Regolo Marina Militare website

Capitani Romani-class cruisers
Ships built in Livorno
1940 ships
World War II cruisers of Italy
Cruisers of the French Navy
Cold War cruisers of Italy